Ben Zinzan Harris (born 20 February 1964) is a retired New Zealand cricketer from Christchurch, Canterbury, who played first-class cricket for Canterbury and Otago cricket teams between 1988 and 1995. A right-hand batsman and right-arm medium bowler, Harris played 35 first-class matches and 15 List-A games, scoring over 1,500 runs at 26.72, with three centuries, and taking six occasional wickets at 48.83. He took two more wickets in one day of cricket, however only managed one half-century in his 163 runs at 20.37. His father, Zin Harris, played Test cricket for New Zealand, as did his more successful brother, Chris Harris, who played 23 Tests and 250 One Day Internationals for his country. Following cricket, Harris began a radio broadcasting career for 23 years at More FM. He now works as an auctioneer for Baileys Real Estate in Christchurch.

References

External links
 

1964 births
Living people
New Zealand cricketers
Canterbury cricketers
Otago cricketers